Santiváñez is a locality in the Cochabamba Department in central Bolivia. It is the capital of Santiváñez Municipality, the second municipal section of the Capinota Province. At the time of census 2001 it had a population of 1,046.

References

External links
 Map of Capinota Province

Populated places in Cochabamba Department